Richard Baker (full name L. Richard Baker III) is an American author and game designer who has worked on many Dungeons & Dragons campaign settings.

Early life, education, and military
Rich Baker was born and raised in Florida, then moved with his family to New Jersey at age ten. Baker graduated from Virginia Tech in 1988 with a degree in English. He received a commission as an ensign in the U.S. Navy, and served as a deck officer for three years on board the USS Tortuga; he qualified as a Surface Warfare Officer and was a lieutenant (junior grade) by the time he left the Navy. Baker married his college sweetheart, Kim Rohrbach. They have two daughters, Alex and Hannah.

Career
Baker began looking for a new career, and found one at TSR. "I'd been playing the AD&D game off and on since 1979. When I decided to leave the Navy, I sent TSR my résumé just for the pure hell of it. TSR sent me back a writing test, which I must have done pretty well on, since they brought me out for an interview in September of 1991. I'd never published a word before then or even worked the convention circuit, but they hired me anyway."

After joining TSR in 1991, Rich worked on most of TSR's product lines at one point or another. By 1998, he had published over thirty game products and many magazine articles. Baker started out writing game products such as Rock of Bral for the Spelljammer line, as well as material for the Forgotten Realms, Planescape, and Ravenloft settings. Baker and Colin McComb co-designed the Birthright campaign setting. The Birthright Campaign Setting boxed set won the 1995 Origins Award for Best New Role-Playing Supplement: "I'm very proud of it. It represents an entirely new approach to the traditional fantasy roleplaying campaign, and the world itself is filled with a strong sense of history." Baker also oversaw the development of the Player's Option series of second edition AD&D manuals, stating "I greatly enjoyed the work I did on the World Builder's Guidebook".

Baker went on to co-design the Alternity science fiction game: "As much as I am proud of my other work, I probably learned the most from the work Bill [Slavicsek] and I put into the Alterity game system. Designing a new roleplaying game from the ground up is an immensely complicated undertaking, and I'm very pleased with the way it turned out." Alternity had been completed while at TSR and was intended to replace Amazing Engine as the company's generic science-fiction system, but was released by Wizards of the Coast after they bought TSR. Aside from various Alternity products, Baker also worked on the Star*Drive and Dark•Matter settings for the game, and worked as Creative Director on them for a time. Baker wrote several novels for various settings as well.

His game work includes Dungeons & Dragons (3rd and 4th Edition), Axis & Allies Miniatures, Axis & Allies Naval Miniatures: War at Sea, and numerous Dungeons & Dragons adventures and sourcebooks.

Rich lived in New Jersey, Virginia, Rhode Island, Virginia again, Louisiana, Virginia a third time, and Wisconsin, but now lives in Auburn, Washington, with his wife Kim, two daughters, and cats. He's a fan of Golden Age SF and the Philadelphia Phillies.

Rich was at the forefront of Wizards of the Coast's range of Forgotten Realms and core Third Edition D&D accessory books, and author of several novels set in and below Faerûn. He also answered questions about the Forgotten Realms at the Wizards website's forums – see the below external links.

Baker led the SCRAMJET team, including James Wyatt, Matt Sernett, Ed Stark, Michele Carter, Stacy Longstreet, and Chris Perkins; this team updated the setting and cosmology of D&D as the fourth edition was being developed. Baker and Bruce Cordell wrote a new release of the Gamma World Roleplaying Game (2010), based on the fourth edition D&D rules. He also headed design on the 4th edition D&D iteration of the Dark Sun Campaign Setting, along with numerous other credits for that edition of the game.

He was also at the forefront of designing the series "Axis and Allies: War at Sea", a game of tactical World War II naval battles.

On December 14, 2011, Baker announced on his Wizards.com community page that Wizards of the Coast had eliminated his position and he would no longer be an employee of the company. He acknowledged the possibility that he would continue to write for the Forgotten Realms novel line, and hoped to continue design work on the company's miniature lines on a freelance basis.

In 2020, Baker announced on his blog that he was joining ZeniMax Online Studios as a senior writer on the Elder Scrolls Online video game.

Bibliography

Forgotten Realms Accessory Books/Adventure Modules
 Unapproachable East (2003)
 Player's Guide to Faerûn (2004)

Creative Director of:

 Magic of Faerûn (2001)
 Lords of Darkness (2001)
 Races of Faerûn (2003)

Developer of:

 Forgotten Realms Campaign Setting (2001)
 Lords of Darkness (2001)
 Races of Faerûn (2003)
 Unapproachable East (2003)
 Underdark (2003)

Dark-Sun Accessory Books/Adventure Modules
 Valley of Dust and Fire (1992)
 The Will and the Way: Psionicists of Athas (1994)
 Dragon's Crown (1993)
 Merchant House of Amketch (1993)

Other Dungeons & Dragons Accessory Books/Adventure Modules
 Spells & Magic (1996)
 World Builder's Guidebook (1996)
 Planescape Monstrous Compendium II (Planescape) (1999)
 The Forge of Fury (2000)
 Complete Arcane (2004)
 Tome of Battle (2006)
 Red Hand of Doom (2006)
 Lost Mine of Phandelver (2014)

Gamma World 7th Edition
 Gamma World Roleplaying Game Rulebook (with Bruce R. Cordell) (2010)
 Gamma World Roleplaying Game Expansion: Legion of Gold (with Bruce R. Cordell) (2011)

Novels
 The Adventures
 The Shadow Stone (1998)
 Double Diamond Triangle Saga
 Easy Betrayals (1998)
 Star*Drive
 Zero Point (1999)
 Birthright
The Falcon and the Wolf (2000 online publication )
 The Cities
 The City of Ravens (2000)
 (R.A. Salvatore's) War of the Spider Queen
 Condemnation (2003)
 The Last Mythal
 Forsaken House (2004)
 Farthest Reach (2005)
 Final Gate (2006)
 Blades of Moonsea
 The Swordmage (2008)
 Corsair (2009)
 Avenger (2010)
 Breaker of Empires
Valiant Dust (2017)
Restless Lightning (2018)
Scornful Stars (2019)

Board games
 Risk Godstorm (2004)
 Ultimate Scheme (2017)

References

External links

Wizards.com interview
The old 'Ask Richard Baker' thread at wizards.com forums
The old 'Ask the Core Rules and Supplement Authors' thread at wizards.com forums
The new 'Ask the Core Rules and Supplement Authors' thread at wizards.com forums
Rich Baker's Blog at wizards.com Archived from the original on June 17, 2013.
Rich Baker's Blog

20th-century American male writers
20th-century American novelists
21st-century American male writers
21st-century American novelists
American fantasy writers
American male novelists
Dungeons & Dragons game designers
Living people
Novelists from Florida
Novelists from New Jersey
United States Navy officers
Virginia Tech alumni
Year of birth missing (living people)